USS Osprey (AMS-28/YMS-422) was a  built for the United States Navy during World War II. She was the third U.S. Navy ship to be named for the osprey.

History
YMS-422 was laid down 9 October 1943 at the Astoria Marine Construction Co., Astoria, Oregon; launched 1 June 1944; sponsored by Mrs. Charles S. Harper, Jr.; and commissioned 27 September 1944.

World War II service 
YMS-422 patrolled off the California coast until reporting for duty with the Hawaiian Sea Frontier early in January 1945. Patrol activities interspersed with minesweeping training absorbed her time until mid-summer when she sailed to the western Pacific Ocean. The approaching end of the war would not and did not end the need for vessels of this type. The removal of minefields around the Japanese home island of Honshū provided the first extensive test of YMS-422's skill at this hazardous work. Operations commenced at Nagoya 18 October, continued at Kobe in December, and this craft was still partially engaged with this task at the outbreak of the Korean War in 1950.

Korean War service 
Previously named and designated Osprey (AMS-28), 17 February 1947, this wooden-hulled ship now sailed directly to help confront this latest communist advance. Osprey made a pre-assault sweep at Pohang 14 July 1950 to clear the way for the 1st Cavalry Division. 15 September her sweeps prepared a firing base anchorage for the big guns of the battleship  at the masterful Inchon landings.

The following month, while engaged in clearing Wonsan Bay, North Korea, two sister ships struck mines and sank. One year later, again at Wonsan, and again operating under enemy fire she suffered 3 shell hits, 29 October which necessitated a brief retirement to Japan. Upon return, her continuing aggressive spirit in seeking out and firing on enemy targets ashore and record breaking performance in mine destruction earned medals and promotions for members of the ship's company. Her sterling performance continued until negotiations produced a truce 27 July 1953.

Osprey, redesignated MSC(O), 7 February 1955, was destined to conclude her career in the Far East. Loaned to the Japanese Maritime Self Defense Force, 22 March 1955, she served as Yakushima (YTE-10) until 1969. Declared surplus to the needs of both the Japanese and United States navies she was struck from the Navy Directory 15 June 1969.

Awards and honors 
YMS-422, received 2 battle stars for post-World War II operations and, as AMS-28, 10 battle stars for Korean War service.

References

External links 
 

YMS-1-class minesweepers of the United States Navy
Ships built in Astoria, Oregon
1944 ships
World War II minesweepers of the United States
Korean War minesweepers of the United States
YMS-1-class minesweepers of the Japan Maritime Self-Defense Force